The Blyvooruitzicht mine is a large mine located near the village of Blyvooruitzicht in the northern part of Gauteng, South Africa. Blyvooruitzicht represents one of the largest gold reserves in South Africa. It is part of the Witwatersrand Basin.

References 

Uranium mines in South Africa
Economy of Gauteng